The album consists of commissioned works by Steve Reich. Music for a Large Ensemble was commissioned by the Holland Festival, Violin Phase was an earlier work that dealt with repetition.

Tracks
"Music for a Large Ensemble"
"Violin Phase"
"Octet"

References

1980 albums
Compositions by Steve Reich
Steve Reich albums